Tillandsia rhodocephala is a species of flowering plant in the genus Tillandsia. This species is endemic to Mexico.  Rhodocephala have long thin leaves which curl inwards and sprout from a thick central stem.

References

rhodocephala
Flora of Mexico